Jagat Jung Kunwar Rana, popularly known as Jagat Jung Rana was a Nepalese politician, military officer and courtier in the Kingdom of Nepal. He was the eldest son of the founder of Rana dynasty, Jung Bahadur Kunwar Rana. He claimed the Premiership of Kingdom of Nepal and the throne of Maharaja of Lamjung and Kaski against the traditional agnatic succession of the Rana dynasty. Driven by this motive, he attempted a coup against his uncles; Maharaja Prime Minister Ranodip Singh Kunwar and Commander-In-Chief Dhir Shamsher Kunwar Rana in the winter of 1881–1882. He was immediately thrown out of the roles of succession among Ranas. Later, he was pardoned and was impeased by Ranodip Singh as his successor after the death of Dhir Shamsher, which caused envy among his Shamsher cousins and ultimately led to his death in the 1885 Shamsher coup.

Early life

He was born at Kathmandu on 1 March 1848 as the second son of  Jung Bahadur Rana with his second wife. In 1839, Jung Bahadur's first infant son had already died, thus, he was referred as the eldest son of Jung Bahadur Rana.

Career

Feud at father's funeral
Jagat Jung and Crown Prince Trailokya of Nepal plotted to force King Surendra of Nepal to abdicate the throne and appoint Jagat Jung as the Prime Minister of Nepal after the death of Jagat Jung's father, Jung Bahadur. Jung Bahadur died on Falgun 1933 V.S. (March 1877) at Rautahat. Dhir Shamsher Rana circulated a rumour that his brother Jung Bahadur was critically ill, upon which Jagat Jung and Crown Prince Trailokya rushed to Patharghatta. On their absence in Kathmandu, Dhir Shamsher immediately imposed King Surendra to declare Ranodip Singh Kunwar as Prime Minister of Nepal and destroyed the plot of Jagat Jung and the Crown Prince. Afterwards Jagat Jung and Prince Trailokya came back to Kathmandu after the funeral, they began to overthrow Jagat Jagat's uncle Dhir Shamsher from the political scenario of Nepal.

Coup attempt of 1938 (1881–82) 
When Commander-In-Chief of the Nepalese Army, Jagat Shamsher Kunwar Rana, died in 1879, Dhir Shamsher succeeded him but did not intend to transfer his current position of Senior Commanding-General of Western Commanding forces to his nephew Jagat Jung because the forces under Western Command were huge. This event further incensed the relationship of Jagat Jung with his uncle Dhir Shamsher. The faction of Bharadars against Ranodip Singh and Dhir Shamsher led by Crown Prince Trailokya and Jagat Jung, attempted coup d'état twice in the year 1938 Vikram Samvat (1881–1882 CE) against both the Prime Minister Ranodip Singh and the Army Chief Dhir Shamsher. Both attempts were aborted, and for the third attempt, the date of execution was fixed on last day of Poush (14 December 1881) when Ranodip Singh went on a hunting trip to Terai. The conspirating faction sought the assistance of Lieutenant Uttardhwaj who had ancestral rivalry with the Shrivikram Singh Thapa, a member of the conspirator group due to which, Lt. Uttardhwaj revealed the plot to Dhir Shamsher who was in Kathmandu and the conspiracy was immediately informed to the entouring Prime Minister Ranodip Singh. Bambir Bikram Rana, Sangramsur Bisht and Amrit Simha Adhikari, members of conspirating faction, revealed the conspiracy. Jagat Jung and Bambir Bikram Rana were removed out of the roles of succession of Ranas.

Coup of 1942 (1885)

Dhir Shamsher died on 14 October 1884. After his death, Maharaja Ranodip Singh called his estranged nephew Jagat Jung and began to impease him. All faction of Ranas knew that Jagat Jung would murder and destroy the Shamsher family if he succeeds the uncle Maharaja Ranodip Singh. The insecurity of sons of Dhir Shamsher (Shamsher faction) escalated  due to impeasement of Jagat Jung by Ranodip Singh and they were against this recent uprising of Jagat Jung. Finally, they overpowered their cousins and conducted the 1885 Shamsher coup. In the coup, Prime Minister Ranodip Singh Kunwar and Jagat Jung were killed. By the coup of 1885, Shamsher brothers established the "rule of seventeen brothers" and a new era in Nepal.

Ancestry

References

Footnotes

Sources

Books

 

 

 
 

1848 births
1885 deaths
19th-century Nepalese nobility
19th-century politicians
Children of prime ministers of Nepal
Nepalese generals
Rana dynasty